Gur-e Dokhtar is an ancient tomb located in the province of Bushehr in Iran. This grave has great similarities to Cyrus II's tomb in Pasargad, but is smaller. The tomb dates to the 6th century BC. It is possibly the tomb of Cyrus the Great's grandfather, Cyrus I.

See also
 Tomb of Cyrus
 Cyrus the Younger
 Teispes
 Cyrus I
 Atossa
 Mandane of Media

References 

 https://fa.wikipedia.org/wiki/%DA%AF%D9%88%D8%B1_%D8%AF%D8%AE%D8%AA%D8%B1

Mausoleums in Iran
Buildings and structures in Bushehr Province